HP Mini is a former line of small computers categorized as netbooks manufactured by Hewlett-Packard. They either contained a custom version of Ubuntu Linux, Microsoft Windows XP Home Edition or Windows 7 Starter operating system. Like most netbooks, they were not built with CD/DVD drives.
They were announced from mid-2007, and marketed from 2008 through 2012.

Models

2133 Mini-Note PC 

The first model.

Mini 1000 and Compaq Mini 700 

The HP Mini 1000 is a netbook by HP, adapting that company's HP 2133 Mini-Note PC education/business netbook for the consumer market. A similar but cheaper model named the HP Compaq Mini 700 will also be available in some regions with different cosmetics. A special edition machine, the HP Mini 1000 Vivienne Tam Edition, designed in collaboration with Vivienne Tam is also available. The three computers have similar specifications.

Specifications
Processor and memory — The HP Mini 1000 uses a 1.60 GHz Intel Atom N270 Processor and includes 1 GB of DDR2-533 memory with support for up to 2GB. The Mini has only one slot for RAM. Due to Microsoft's restrictions, the XP versions were only sold with 1GB of RAM, but a user can easily upgrade to 2GB by accessing the slot on the bottom of the computer and replacing the module.

Storage — The HP Mini 1000 shipped with either a 16/32GB SSD or a 60/80GB 1.8" hard disk drive. The HP Mini 1000 Mi Edition was also available with an 8GB SSD. A ZIF SATA connector is used as opposed to standard PATA/SATA connector cables.

Motherboard — The motherboard uses the Intel 945GSE northbridge chipset and Intel ICH7M southbridge. The motherboard model is HP361A. The northbridge component provides the integrated Intel GMA950 graphics core.

Display — The Mini features either an 8.9- or 10.1-inch LED-backlit display. The 8.9" display has a resolution of 1024x600 pixels, the 10.1" is 1024x576 (10.2" @ 1024x600 is no longer sold). Both models feature stereo speakers, a webcam, and a single audio jack for both mic and headphones. Both the unit and the dock connector can carry a VGA connection. A first-party adaptor is available from the HP online store.

Power — A 3-cell battery is included as standard. A 6-cell battery can be ordered as an accessory, or (with the Mini 1000 and Digital Clutch only) chosen in place of the 3-cell battery during configuration. The 3-cell and 6-cell batteries provide up to 3 hours and 6 hours of run-time, respectively.

Connectivity — In addition to the aforementioned card reader, the system has two standard USB ports, a 10/100 Mbit Ethernet port, a single 3.5mm audio in/out mini-jack, and a power connector. The Mini 1000 also has a proprietary dock connector which can carry VGA, USB, RJ-45 (over USB), analogue audio in/out, and power. An 802.11b/g wireless NIC (Broadcom BCM4312) is included for Wi-Fi, while Bluetooth 2.0+EDR and a built-in HSDPA modem are options. It can be connected to Verizon for a one- or two-year contract.

Software
The Mini has Windows XP & Windows 7 Starter installed at launch and can be upgraded to Windows 10, while Mi (a special HP operating system based on Ubuntu, named for "mobile Internet" containing "HP MediaStyle" based on Elisa) was released in early January 2009 on the HP Mini 1000 "Mi Edition."

Reception 
Initial reviews have been positive, complimenting the computer's keyboard and aesthetics as particular selling points in comparison to its market rivals, and the improved battery life and performance, and reduced price, as particularly important improvements over its antecedent, the HP 2133. However, reviewers noted that the diminutive 1.8-inch hard drive, usually used in digital audio players, performed slower than the 2.5-inch drives in competitors and criticized the decision to charge separately for a VGA adaptor. Although the battery life has been improved, it still does not stand out from the competition.

110

The HP Mini 110 is a line of low-end netbooks computers manufactured and sold by HP. The Mini 110 laptops have a different cases, similar to compact palmtops models (in early versions) or a regular affordable netbooks (last releases).

210

Some models of HP Mini 210 cannot run latest version of Windows 10 due to display driver problems.

311

This netbook was the first to use the Nvidia Ion platform, which allows hardware acceleration of high-definition video and increased gaming performance. It went on sale on HP's online store on September 24, 2009 for $399.99.

The laptop can be customized with either the Intel Atom N270 or N280 and uses the nVidia GeForce 9400M G graphics used in the ION platform. The unit is equipped with 1 GB of 1066 MHz DDR3 SDRAM soldered to the motherboard and a SO-DIMM slot which allows an upgrade to 2 GB or 3 GB. The netbook has a 160 GB, 250 GB, or 320 GB SATA hard drive @ 5,400 RPM. There are options for an external DVD burner or DVD burner/Blu-ray reader combo drive, as netbooks do not have integrated optical drives due to their small size. The Mini 311 has an 11.6" Led-backlit BrightView widescreen with a 1366 x 768 resolution and has an integrated webcam standard. Wi-Fi card options include Wireless G or Wireless N cards with optional Bluetooth and as well as optional Mobile Broadband from Verizon Wireless, AT&T or Sprint. I/O connectors include a 5-in-1 removable card reader, 3 USB 2.0 ports, a Fast Ethernet port, a VGA output, an HDMI output. The netbook uses Altec Lansing stereo speakers. There are 2 models in some areas. One has 1GB RAM and Windows XP with ION LE and the other has 2GB RAM and Windows 7 with ION.

In some regions, including Europe, the device is sold under the Compaq brand.

2140

The HP Mini 2140 is an update to the HP 2133 Mini-Note PC which was announced in early January 2009.

Details
The new components are a 1.6 GHz single-core Intel Atom processor, a 10.2-inch "standard definition" or "high definition" (1024×576 or 1366×768 pixel) LED-backlit LCD display (with a glass cover and acrylic coating), an Intel GMA 950 graphics adapter, and a 160GB HDD (5400 or 7200rpm) or 80GB eMMC-based solid-state drive. Operating systems available are similar to those for the Mini-Note 2133: SUSE Linux Enterprise Desktop, FreeDOS, Windows Vista (Home Basic or Business), Windows XP Home (only on 1GB RAM models) or Professional (through downgrade rights from Vista Business).

Its features, accessories and appearance are otherwise identical to the HP 2133, however HP predict that the new processor and screen will give it up to 8.5 hours of run time on the 6-cell battery. A docking station will be made available. The updated machine was initially available in various configurations with prices starting at $499USD for a system with the "standard definition" display, hard disk drive, 1GB of RAM, and 3-cell battery, without Bluetooth or 802.11n support, running Windows XP Home.

The successor version, HP Mini 2150 was announced, but not presented.

Reception
A review by Laptop Magazine (of a system with a 1024×576 pixel display and 2GB of RAM running Windows XP) has complimented HP for addressing common criticisms of the earlier model. The reviewer notes that the Mini 2140 produced much less heat, although the underside did become warm, and had much improved battery life compared to the Mini-Note 2133. Their system continuously loaded websites for 3 hours and 32 minutes on the small 3-cell battery, and 7 hours and 19 minutes on the larger 6-cell battery. However, the reviewer chided HP for the low resolution display which showed approximately "two lines" less than netbooks with 1024×600 pixel displays. Otherwise, praises and criticisms of the 2140 were similar to those for the 2133. The magazine gave the system their "Editor's Choice" award.

Similar products from HP
A new HP notebook similar in appearance to the Mini-Note, called the HP Mini 1000 Vivienne Tam Edition, was unveiled in October 2008, with a launch expected for December that year. The small pink computer is a collaboration with fashion designer Vivienne Tam, and has a 10-inch screen, a 1.6 GHz Intel Atom processor, 1GB of RAM, and an 80GB hard disk drive. A few days later, a black notebook of otherwise similar appearance called the "HP Mini 1000" was informally revealed by a banner on the company's store, and officially announced on the 29 October 2008. Unlike the 2133, this device is meant for the home market.

5101 
The HP Mini 5101 contains an Intel Atom N280 processor and usually 1 GB RAM.
https://www.notebookcheck.net/Review-HP-Mini-5101-Netbook.18884.0.html

5102

5103
The HP Mini 5103 was announced in 2010.
Compared to the HP Mini 210, it had advanced features like touch screen, Intel Atom N550 Processor.

1103

References

External links

CNET review of HP Mini 1000
CNET Review of HP Mini 311
CNet review of HP Mini 210

Engadget article about HP Mini 210
Eweek article about HP Mini 210

Mini
Discontinued products
Linux-based devices
Subnotebooks
Netbooks
Computer-related introductions in 2008
Products and services discontinued in 2012

ru:HP 2133 Mini-Note PC